Kent, Indiana may refer to:

Kent, Jefferson County, Indiana
Kentland, Indiana